Gertrudis Josefa del Carmen Echenique y Mujica (1849–1928) was First Lady of Chile between 1896 and 1901.

She was born in Santiago, the daughter of Juan José Echenique Bascuñán and of his second wife, Jesús Mujica Echaurren. She married Federico Errázuriz Echaurren in 1868, and together they had two children: Federico (1869-1897) and Elena Errázuriz Echeñique (1870-1966). After the death of her husband, she withdrew to her hacienda of El Huique, in the province of Colchagua, which she continued to manage until her death.

See also
First Ladies of Chile

External links
Genealogical chart of Errázuriz family 
Museum of El Huique 

1849 births
1928 deaths
People from Santiago
First ladies of Chile
Chilean people of Basque descent
19th-century Chilean people